Klimovsky (masculine), Klimovskaya (feminine), or Klimovskoye (neuter) is the name of several  rural localities in Russia.

Arkhangelsk Oblast
As of 2010, six rural localities in Arkhangelsk Oblast bear this name:
Klimovskaya, Kargopolsky District, Arkhangelsk Oblast, a village in Priozerny Selsoviet of Kargopolsky District
Klimovskaya, Konoshsky District, Arkhangelsk Oblast, a village in Klimovsky Selsoviet of Konoshsky District
Klimovskaya, Nyandomsky District, Arkhangelsk Oblast, a village in Moshinsky Selsoviet of Nyandomsky District
Klimovskaya, Shenkursky District, Arkhangelsk Oblast, a village in Ust-Padengsky Selsoviet of Shenkursky District
Klimovskaya, Ustyansky District, Arkhangelsk Oblast, a village in Rostovsky Selsoviet of Ustyansky District
Klimovskaya, Vilegodsky District, Arkhangelsk Oblast, a village in Belyayevsky Selsoviet of Vilegodsky District

Ivanovo Oblast
As of 2010, one rural locality in Ivanovo Oblast bears this name:
Klimovskaya, Ivanovo Oblast, a village in Lukhsky District

Kaluga Oblast
As of 2010, one rural locality in Kaluga Oblast bears this name:
Klimovskoye, Kaluga Oblast, a village in Borovsky District

Komi Republic
As of 2010, one rural locality in the Komi Republic bears this name:
Klimovskaya, Komi Republic, a village in Noshul Selo Administrative Territory of Priluzsky District

Kostroma Oblast
As of 2010, one rural locality in Kostroma Oblast bears this name:
Klimovskoye, Kostroma Oblast, a settlement in Sudayskoye Settlement of Chukhlomsky District

Moscow Oblast
As of 2010, one rural locality in Moscow Oblast bears this name:
Klimovskaya, Moscow Oblast, a village in Krivandinskoye Rural Settlement of Shatursky District

Tula Oblast
As of 2010, three rural localities in Tula Oblast bear this name:
Klimovskoye, Shchyokinsky District, Tula Oblast, a village in Nikolskaya Rural Administration of Shchyokinsky District
Klimovskoye, Klimovskaya Rural Territory, Yasnogorsky District, Tula Oblast, a selo in Klimovskaya Rural Territory of Yasnogorsky District
Klimovskoye, Znamenskaya Rural Territory, Yasnogorsky District, Tula Oblast, a village in Znamenskaya Rural Territory of Yasnogorsky District

Tver Oblast
As of 2010, one rural locality in Tver Oblast bears this name:
Klimovskoye, Tver Oblast, a village in Udomelsky District

Vladimir Oblast
As of 2010, two rural localities in Vladimir Oblast bear this name:
Klimovskaya, Sudogodsky District, Vladimir Oblast, a village in Sudogodsky District
Klimovskaya, Vyaznikovsky District, Vladimir Oblast, a village in Vyaznikovsky District

Vologda Oblast
As of 2010, eight rural localities in Vologda Oblast bear this name:
Klimovskoye, Cherepovetsky District, Vologda Oblast, a village in Klimovsky Selsoviet of Cherepovetsky District
Klimovskoye, Totemsky District, Vologda Oblast, a village in Nikolsky Selsoviet of Totemsky District
Klimovskaya, Babushkinsky District, Vologda Oblast, a village in Demyanovsky Selsoviet of Babushkinsky District
Klimovskaya, Cherepovetsky District, Vologda Oblast, a village in Abakanovsky Selsoviet of Cherepovetsky District
Klimovskaya, Totemsky District, Vologda Oblast, a village in Kalininsky Selsoviet of Totemsky District
Klimovskaya, Mishutinsky Selsoviet, Vozhegodsky District, Vologda Oblast, a village in Mishutinsky Selsoviet of Vozhegodsky District
Klimovskaya, Nizhneslobodsky Selsoviet, Vozhegodsky District, Vologda Oblast, a village in Nizhneslobodsky Selsoviet of Vozhegodsky District
Klimovskaya, Vytegorsky District, Vologda Oblast, a village in Tudozersky Selsoviet of Vytegorsky District

Yaroslavl Oblast
As of 2010, five rural localities in Yaroslavl Oblast bear this name:
Klimovskoye, Nekrasovsky District, Yaroslavl Oblast, a village in Klimovsky Rural Okrug of Nekrasovsky District
Klimovskoye, Kolodinsky Rural Okrug, Poshekhonsky District, Yaroslavl Oblast, a village in Kolodinsky Rural Okrug of Poshekhonsky District
Klimovskoye, Yermakovsky Rural Okrug, Poshekhonsky District, Yaroslavl Oblast, a village in Yermakovsky Rural Okrug of Poshekhonsky District
Klimovskoye, Rybinsky District, Yaroslavl Oblast, a village in Mikhaylovsky Rural Okrug of Rybinsky District
Klimovskoye, Yaroslavsky District, Yaroslavl Oblast, a village in Teleginsky Rural Okrug of Yaroslavsky District